The 1993–94 Sri Lankan cricket season featured two Test series with Sri Lanka playing against India and West Indies.

Honours
 P Saravanamuttu Trophy – Nondescripts Cricket Club
 Hatna Trophy – Bloomfield Cricket and Athletic Club
 Most runs – MAR Samarasekera 701 @ 50.07 (HS 191)
 Most wickets – AMN Munasinghe 46 @ 16.43 (BB 9-38)

Test series
India won the first Test series 1–0 with 2 matches drawn:
 1st Test @ Asgiriya Stadium, Kandy – match drawn
 2nd Test @ Sinhalese Sports Club Ground, Colombo – India won by 235 runs
 3rd Test @ Paikiasothy Saravanamuttu Stadium, Colombo – match drawn

The second tour featured the inaugural Test between Sri Lanka and West Indies:
 1st Test @ Tyronne Fernando Stadium, Moratuwa – match drawn

External sources
  CricInfo – brief history of Sri Lankan cricket
 CricketArchive – Tournaments in Sri Lanka

Further reading
 Wisden Cricketers' Almanack 1995

Sri Lankan cricket seasons from 1972–73 to 1999–2000